The Parlementair Documentatie Centrum (PDC), in English the Parliamentary Documentation Centre, is a Dutch institute connected to Leiden University that documents parliamentary history. It is part of the Montesquieu Institute on Campus The Hague, and situated at 86 Lange Voorhout.

Its function is to collect and make available information about the Dutch Parliament, and it manages several websites about European matters. The centre was founded in 1974.

References

External links
 

Leiden University